Purwojaya is an executive passenger train operated by PT Kereta Api Indonesia for use between Cilacap and Jakarta's Gambir station. It is the only train running the route.

Timetable 
Timetable as of February 2021.

See also
 Rail transport in Indonesia
 List of named passenger trains of Indonesia

References

External links 
 

Passenger rail transport in Indonesia